Wyatt Jess Oleff (born July 13, 2003) is an American actor, known for portraying the role of Stanley Uris in the 2017 supernatural horror film It and its 2019 sequel, as well as the role of Stanley Barber in the coming-of-age comedy-drama streaming television series I Am Not Okay With This, and Peter Quill as a child in the Marvel Studios superhero film Guardians of the Galaxy in 2014 and its sequel Guardians of the Galaxy Vol. 2 in 2017.

Early life 
Oleff was born in Chicago, Illinois, to Doug and Jennifer Oleff, living there for the first seven years of his life. He then moved to Los Angeles with his parents and began acting. One of his earliest acting roles was in a commercial for Coldwell Banker.

Filmography

Awards and nominations
 Catalina Film Festival
 2017 — Crest Award—Acting — Guardians of the Galaxy; It (Won)
 MTV Movie & TV Awards
 2018 — MTV Movie Award for Best On-Screen Team (with Finn Wolfhard, Sophia Lillis, Jaeden Martell, Jack Dylan Grazer, Jeremy Ray Taylor, and Chosen Jacobs) — It (Won)

References

External links 

2003 births
Living people
American male child actors
21st-century American male actors
Male actors from Chicago